Demi-Gods and Semi-Devils is a wuxia novel by Jin Yong (Louis Cha). It was first serialised concurrently from 3 September 1963 to 27 May 1966 in the newspapers Ming Pao in Hong Kong and Nanyang Siang Pau in Singapore. It has been adapted into films and television series in Hong Kong, Taiwan and Mainland China numerous times since the 1970s. Set in 11th-century China, the plot is made up of separate yet intertwining storylines revolving around three protagonists – Qiao Feng, Duan Yu and Xuzhu – and other characters from various empires (Song, Liao, Dali, Western Xia and Tibet) and martial arts sects. The novel examines the cause and effect that form and break the inherent bonds underlying each major character's struggles on five uniquely corresponding levels: self, family, society, ethnic group, and country (dominion).

The novel's Chinese title is a reference to the eight races of demi-gods and semi-devils described in Buddhist cosmology as the major characters are based on the eight races. In Buddhism, these demi-gods and semi-devils are markedly different from the human race but are still bound to Saṃsāra by their own desires. Jin Yong originally modelled each major character after one of the races but, as he continued writing, the complexity of the story made it impossible for such a simplistic mapping.  The novel's title has been a challenge for translators for years before it was decided to be Demi-Gods and Semi-Devils. An alternative English title is Eight Books of the Heavenly Dragon.

Plot
The plot is made up of separate yet intertwining storylines revolving around three protagonists – Qiao Feng, Duan Yu and Xuzhu – who become sworn brothers in chapter 41. The complex narrative switches from the initial perspective of Duan Yu to those of the other protagonists and back.

Duan Yu's story
Duan Yu is a young and naïve prince of the Dali Kingdom. His reverence for Buddhist teachings and disdain for bloodshed prompt him to defy his family's tradition of practising martial arts. When his father, Duan Zhengchun, tries to force him to learn martial arts, he runs away from home. Ironically, for the sake of survival, he ends up mastering three powerful skills and becomes a formidable martial artist. In addition, he acquires immunity to poison after accidentally consuming the Zhuha, a venomous toad.

During his adventures, he encounters five young maidens – Zhong Ling, Mu Wanqing, Wang Yuyan, Azhu and Azi – and becomes romantically involved with the first three. However, at different points in the novel, each of them is revealed to be actually his half-sister due to Duan Zhengchun's secret affairs with other women in the past. Of these maidens, he is extremely obsessed with Wang Yuyan, who resembles a statue of a fairy-like lady he chanced upon before. He relentlessly tries to win her heart but she does not reciprocate because she has a crush on her cousin, Murong Fu.

Towards the end of the novel, in a tragic twist of events, Duan Yu finds out that he is actually not Duan Zhengchun's biological son, hence he can marry all the three maidens. In the original ending, his love life ends on a happy note when Wang Yuyan finally realises that he truly loves her and decides to marry him. However, after the book was published, many readers disliked this ending as it relegated Mu Wanqing to a minor role in the story. In the latest revision of the novel, Duan Yu and Wang Yuyan's romance is marred by a series of incidents which eventually cause them to be separated and Duan Yu ends up with Mu Wanqing and Zhong Ling.

Qiao Feng's story
Qiao Feng is the charismatic chief of the Beggars' Sect who possesses strong leadership qualities and exceptional prowess in martial arts. He falls from grace after he is revealed to be a Khitan, and after he is wrongly accused of murdering his adoptive parents and some fellow martial artists. He becomes an outcast of the wulin (martial artists' community) of the Han Chinese-dominated Song Empire, which is at war with the Khitan-led Liao Empire. Qiao Feng's relations with the Han Chinese martial artists worsen due to the Song–Liao conflict, and also because he is now seen as a murderer and a threat to the wulin. He is forced to sever ties with them and engage them in a one-against-several battle, during which he single-handedly kills many opponents, including some of his old friends and acquaintances.

Qiao Feng leaves to verify the claims that he is a Khitan and investigate the murders. He is accompanied by Azhu, who loves him and stands by him when the wulin turns against him. After a long journey in disguise, he concludes that he is indeed a Khitan and changes his name to Xiao Feng to reflect his ancestry. In tracking down a mysterious "Leading Big Brother", whom he believes is responsible for the murders and his parents' deaths, he mistakenly thinks that Duan Zhengchun is the "Leading Big Brother", and challenges him to a one-to-one fight. However, the event turns into a tragedy when Azhu finds out she is Duan Zhengchun's daughter and she disguises herself as her father and allows Xiao Feng to kill her. It is too late when Xiao Feng realises his mistake. Before dying, Azhu tells Xiao Feng that Duan Zhengchun is actually her father, and she hopes that her sacrifice will satisfy his thirst for vengeance.

Feeling regret and sorrow, Xiao Feng leaves Song territory with Azi, Azhu's younger sister, whom he has promised to take care of. Azi has a crush on him but he does not reciprocate her feelings as he loved only her sister. They wander far into northeast China and settle down among the Jurchen tribes. By chance, Xiao Feng encounters the Liao emperor, Yelü Hongji, becomes sworn brothers with him, and helps him suppress a rebellion by a Liao prince. In return, Xiao Feng receives the prince's title and estate. Xiao Feng returns to the Song Empire later to find Azi and attend a wulin gathering at Shaolin Monastery, where he combines forces with Duan Yu and Xuzhu to overcome their foes. At Shaolin, the truths behind all the murders are revealed and the guilty parties receive their just deserts; Xiao Feng also successfully proves his innocence and makes peace with the wulin.

Towards the end of the novel, Yelü Hongji plans to invade the Song Empire and wants Xiao Feng to support him, but the latter refuses and attempts to dissuade him to prevent bloodshed. The Liao emperor imprisons Xiao Feng and leads his army to attack Song. In the meantime, Azi escapes from Liao and seeks help from Duan Yu, Xuzhu and their allies. Impressed by Xiao Feng's righteousness, they manage to rally martial artists from throughout the wulin to join them in rescuing Xiao Feng. Even though the mission is successful, they are ultimately outnumbered and trapped by Liao forces at Yanmen Pass. Xiao Feng takes Yelü Hongji hostage and forces him to promise that there will be no war between Song and Liao for as long as he lives. He then commits suicide while Azi follows suit.

Xuzhu's story
Xuzhu is a monk from the Shaolin Sect who is described to have a kind-hearted and submissive personality. He strongly believes in following the Buddhist code of conduct and refuses to break it even when he faces life-threatening situations. He follows his elders to a meeting, which marks the start of his adventures. By coincidence and sheer luck, he breaks a weiqi formation and inherits the powers and position of Wuyazi, the leader of the Carefree Sect. Later, he encounters Tianshan Tonglao, learns martial arts from her, and eventually succeeds her as the ruler of Lingjiu Palace, which commands allegiance from a loose assembly of martial artists.

Feeling overwhelmed by the sudden influx of responsibilities and a major leap in martial prowess, Xuzhu desires to detach himself from these duties and return to his former monastic life. However, he is unable to wrench himself free from the various tribulations and dangers that lie ahead. He is no longer regarded as a Shaolin monk and has no choice but to accept his fate. He also has a pitiful parentage: he is actually the illegitimate son of Xuanci, the abbot of Shaolin, and Ye Erniang, one of the "Four Evils". His reunion with his parents is fated to be the first and also the last. Later, by chance again, he becomes the prince consort of Western Xia due to his previous affair with Princess Yinchuan, to whom he is deeply in love and happily married.

Characters

Adaptations

Films

Television

Video games
 Demi-Gods and Semi-Devils is a single player RPG released in 2002. The player takes on the role of an unrelated protagonist (default name Lei Zhen) and meets characters from the novel. His choices and actions will affect how the story progresses.
 Dragon Oath, also known as TLBB in China, is a MMORPG developed by Changyou and Sohu, and was launched in 2007.
 Tian Long Ba Bu: Shen Bing Hai Yu is a MMORPG developed by Changyou and Sohu, and was launched in China on 25 October 2012. The game is endorsed by Hu Ge and Cecilia Liu, who appeared as Duan Yu and Wang Yuyan respectively in a short video promoting the game and other promotional material.

References

External links
  Demi-Gods and Semi-Devils  at cnnovels.com

 
1963 novels
Novels by Jin Yong
Novels first published in serial form
Works originally published in Ming Pao
Novels set in the Northern Song
Liao dynasty in fiction
Western Xia in fiction
Chinese novels adapted into television series
Novels about racism
Shaolin Temple
Shaolin Temple in fiction
Novels set in Yunnan
Novels set in Henan
Novels set in Shanxi
Novels set in Ningxia
Novels set in Zhejiang
Novels set in Jiangsu